Kārlis Mīlenbahs (his surname was formerly also written as Mühlenbach, Mühlenbachs, Mǖlenbachs or Mīlenbachs) (18 January 1853 in Courland – 27 March 1916 in Võru, Estonia) was the first native speaker of Latvian to devote his career to linguistics. Mīlenbahs studied classical philology at the University of Dorpat (he did not remain at the university because of his poverty). He was the author of over a hundred scholarly articles on the language in Latvian, Russian, and German, but his main achievement was the Latvian-German dictionary that remains the most important lexicographical work on Latvian (the first four volumes were printed posthumously between 1923 and 1932 in Riga; the dictionary was completed and expanded by Jānis Endzelīns, with whom Mīlenbahs co-wrote other works, including a major Latvian grammar). His polemics with the poet Rainis led to an important essay on literary Latvian published in 1909, and he was also a translator of the Odyssey (1890–95).

External links 
 Mīlenbahs' and Endzelīns' Latvian-German Dictionary (The page is in Latvian. Type "demo" in both login fields to obtain entries beginning with "A" and "Ā," no registration needed; registering for access to the entire dictionary is free, but the registration form is in Latvian only.)

Balticists
1853 births
1916 deaths
People from Kandava Municipality
People from Courland Governorate
Linguists from Latvia
University of Tartu alumni
Translators of Homer